Telegonus  (Ancient Greek: Τηλέγονος means "born afar") is the name shared by three different characters in Greek mythology.

 Telegonus, a king of Egypt who was sometimes said to have married the nymph Io.
 Telegonus, a Thracian son of Proteus by Torone (Chrysonoe) of Phlegra, daughter of King Cleitus of Sithones. He was the brother of Polygonus (Tmolus). Because of Telegonus' and his brother's great violence towards strangers, Proteus prayed to their grandsire Poseidon to carry him back to Egypt. They met their demise when they challenged Heracles to wrestle at the behest of Hera but lost their life in the battle.
 Telegonus, the youngest son of Circe and Odysseus.

Notes

References 

 Apollodorus, The Library with an English Translation by Sir James George Frazer, F.B.A., F.R.S. in 2 Volumes, Cambridge, MA, Harvard University Press; London, William Heinemann Ltd. 1921. . Online version at the Perseus Digital Library. Greek text available from the same website.
Conon, Fifty Narrations, surviving as one-paragraph summaries in the Bibliotheca (Library) of Photius, Patriarch of Constantinople translated from the Greek by Brady Kiesling. Online version at the Topos Text Project.
Lycophron, The Alexandra  translated by Alexander William Mair. Loeb Classical Library Volume 129. London: William Heinemann, 1921. Online version at the Topos Text Project.
Lycophron, Alexandra translated by A.W. Mair. London: William Heinemann; New York: G.P. Putnam's Sons. 1921. Greek text available at the Perseus Digital Library.
John Tzetzes, Book of Histories, Book II-IV translated by Gary Berkowitz from the original Greek of T. Kiessling's edition of 1826. Online version at theio.com
Stephanus of Byzantium, Stephani Byzantii Ethnicorum quae supersunt, edited by August Meineike (1790-1870), published 1849. A few entries from this important ancient handbook of place names have been translated by Brady Kiesling. Online version at the Topos Text Project.

Children of Odysseus
Thracian characters in Greek mythology
Greek mythology of Thrace
Mythology of Heracles